Leonard Arthur Templar (born 18 December 1930) is a former Australian rules footballer who played with North Melbourne in the Victorian Football League (VFL).

Notes

External links 

		
Living people
1931 births
Australian rules footballers from Victoria (Australia)		
North Melbourne Football Club players
Redan Football Club players